Georgi Dobrevo is a village in the municipality of Lyubimets, in Haskovo Province, in southern Bulgaria. It was known as Bunaklı (Also Yunaklu and Bunaklu in 16th Ottoman records) before 1934

References

Villages in Haskovo Province